Ek Boonsawad (born 30 October 1988 in Chonburi) is a Thai windsurfer. He competed at the 2008 and 2012 Summer Olympics in the men's RS:X category.

References

External links
 
 
 

1988 births
Living people
Ek Boonsawad
Ek Boonsawad
Ek Boonsawad
Sailors at the 2008 Summer Olympics – RS:X
Sailors at the 2012 Summer Olympics – RS:X
Asian Games medalists in sailing
Ek Boonsawad
Ek Boonsawad
Sailors at the 2010 Asian Games
Sailors at the 2014 Asian Games
Medalists at the 2010 Asian Games
Medalists at the 2014 Asian Games
Ek Boonsawad
Southeast Asian Games medalists in sailing
Competitors at the 2007 Southeast Asian Games
Competitors at the 2011 Southeast Asian Games
Ek Boonsawad